Shrek: Fairy Tale Freakdown is an action fighting video game based on the Shrek franchise, developed by Prolific and published by TDK Mediactive for Game Boy Color in 2001. It is the only Shrek game released for the Game Boy Color, and is the first video game based on Shrek released overall.

Gameplay 
Shrek: Fairy Tale Freakdown is a 2D action fighting game in which a player controlled character and an AI controlled character use offensive and defensive attacks, with the goal of depleting their opponent's health. If the player defeats the enemy, they will be presented with a password, which can be entered into the password menu on the main screen to play from their current position in the game. Upon completing all 9 stages, the player is granted the rank of champion.

Alongside the 'Play Game' mode, is the 'Practice' mode, in which the player is given the option of practicing their attacks on a stationary enemy on a randomly selected stage. In this mode, the opponent character will never move or attack the player, and will regenerate health when not in combat for a few moments.

Stages 
There are a total of 9 unique stages in the game.

 Forest
 Village
 Dungeon
 Swamp
 Dark Forest
 Bridge
 Castle
 Wrestling Ring
 Mirror Room

Characters 
Of the 9 total playable characters in the game, 6 are playable from the start, and the other 3 must first be unlocked by defeating them in combat.

 Shrek
 Wolf
 Pinocchio
 Monsieur Robin Hood
 Princess Fiona
 Thelonius
 Ginger Bread Man (unlocked by defeating in Dungeon)
 The Dragon (unlocked by defeating in Bridge)
 Lord Farquaad (unlocked by defeating in Mirror Room)

Reception

The game received generally negative reviews according to the review aggregation website GameRankings. The game has been criticized for its lack of moves, strategy, and a two-player mode. Game Informer described the game as "handheld misery" and suggested that Satan himself crafted it.

References

External links
 

2001 video games
Fighting games
Game Boy Color games
Game Boy Color-only games
Shrek video games
Video games developed in the United States
TDK Mediactive games
Single-player video games